Willis Rippon (15 May 1886 – 16 March 1956) was an English professional footballer who played as a centre forward in the Football League for Bristol City, Grimsby Town and Woolwich Arsenal. He also had a notable spell in Scotland with Hamilton Academical, with whom he scored 22 goals in 39 league appearances.

Personal life 
Rippon's brother Pip was also a footballer and both played together at Woolwich Arsenal and Grimsby Town. He served in the British Armed Forces during the First World War.

Career statistics

References

1886 births
1956 deaths
Footballers from Sheffield
English footballers
Association football forwards
Rawmarsh Welfare F.C. players
Kilnhurst Colliery F.C. players
Bristol City F.C. players
Arsenal F.C. players
Brentford F.C. players
Hamilton Academical F.C. players
Grimsby Town F.C. players
Rotherham County F.C. players
Rotherham Town F.C. (1899) players
English Football League players
Southern Football League players
Midland Football League players
Scottish Football League players
People from Beighton, Sheffield
Footballers from Derbyshire

British military personnel of World War I